The administrative divisions of Khmelnytskyi Oblast follows the general scheme of the administrative divisions in Ukraine. It is subdivided into districts (raions) which are subdivided into territorial communities (hromadas). As Ukraine is a unitary state, any changes to the administrative divisions have to be approved by the Verkhovna Rada.

The oblast was established on September 22, 1937, as the "Kamianets-Podilskyi Oblast" to replace the Kamianets Okruha and other neighboring administrative regions in the Ukrainian Soviet Socialist Republic. Its administrative center was moved from Kamianets-Podilskyi to Proskuriv in 1941, and when Proskuriv's name was changed to Khmelnytskyi, the oblast's name was changed as well. The administrative divisions in the oblast have remained the same since January 1, 2006.

Its population was 1,426,649 at the 2001 census. The oblast borders upon Rivne Oblast to the northwest, Zhytomyr Oblast to the northeast, Vinnytsia Oblast to the east, Chernivtsi Oblast to the south, and Ternopil Oblast to the west.

The oblast has 24 urban-type settlements, 568 rural municipalities, 1409 villages, and five rural settlements.

Current

On 18 July 2020, the number of districts was reduced to three. These are:
 Kamianets-Podilskyi (Кам’янець-Подільський район), the center is in the town of Kamianets-Podilskyi;
 Khmelnytskyi (Хмельницький район), the center is in the city of Khmelnytskyi;
 Shepetivka (Шепетівський район), the center is in the town of Shepetivka.

Administrative divisions before 2020
Before July 2020, the Khmelnytskyi Oblast was administratively divided into 20 districts (райони). which served as the second level of administrative division in the country. It had a total of 13 cities, six of which are under the oblast's jurisdiction (including its administrative center Khmelnytskyi) and seven which are under their raion's jurisdiction.

Populated settlements

Cities
Khmelnytskyi Oblast has a total of 13 cities, with six of them governed under the oblast's jurisdiction (міста обласного значення), and the remaining seven under their respective district's jurisdiction (міста районного значення). Each urban locality also administers their own respective municipality, which can have a few villages and settlements under its jurisdiction. The combined urban population of the cities and urban-type settlements was 723,431 in 2001.

Cities under oblast jurisdiction

 Kamianets-Podilskyi  
 Khmelnytskyi (administrative center) 
 Netishyn  
 Slavuta  
 Shepetivka 
 Starokostiantyniv

Cities under raion jurisdiction
 Derazhnia
 Dunaivtsi  
 Horodok  
 Iziaslav  
 Krasyliv  
 Polonne  
 Volochysk

Urban-type settlements
Khmelnytskyi Oblast has a total of 24 urban-type settlements (селищ міського типу). Each urban locality also administers their own respective municipality, which can have a few villages and settlements under its jurisdiction.

 Antoniny 
 Bazaliia 
 Bilohiria 
 Chemerivtsi 
 Chornyi Ostriv 
 Hrytsiv

 Dunaivtsi 
 Letychiv  
 Lozove 
 Medzhybizh 
 Narkevychi  
 Nova Ushytsia

 Poninka  
 Sataniv 
 Smotrych  
 Stara Syniava 
 Stara Ushytsia  
 Teofipol

 Vinkivtsi  
 Viitivtsi 
 Vovkovyntsi  
 Yampil 
 Yarmolyntsi 
 Zakupne

Villages
Khmelnytskyi Oblast has a total of 1,409 villages (сіл) and five settlements (селищ). Out of the 1,409 villages, 568 villages administer their own rural municipality (сільських рад) which may have a few other villages under its jurisdiction. The combined rural population of the villages and settlements was 703,218 in 2001.

See also
 Administrative divisions of Ukraine
 Volhynia, a historical region in the oblast's northern part
 Podolia, a historical region in the oblast's southern part

References

External links

 

Khmelnytskyi Oblast
Khmelnytskyi Oblast